Celia Griffin (1841 – March 1847) was an Irish famine victim. 

Griffin was born and raised on the Martin estate in Connemara, being a native of Corindulla, near Ross. The family were badly hit by the famine, and in February 1847 walked the thirty miles to Galway in search of relief. "However, many city dwellers shunned these refugees arriving amongst them, a situation born more out of fear of contacting disease rather than selfishness or indifference." 

Brother Paul O'Connor ran the Orphans' Breakfast Institute in Lombard Street, where Celia and her siblings were fed. However, more and more people arrived each day, and the Institute could not feed them all. 

What became of Griffin's parents is unknown. She and her two sisters were taken into the Presentation Convent on Presentation Road in the second week of March when Celia collapsed on the street. Attempts by the nuns to save her failed and she died as a result of the effects of starvation. An inquest into her death was held on Thursday 11 March 1847. 

" An inquest was held on Thursday last, before Michael Perrin, Esq., D.C., at the Presentation Convent, on view of the body of Celia Griffin, a girl about six years of age, from the village of Corindulla, near Ross, in this county. It appeared in evidence that the poor creature had been reduced to extreme poverty and that the family to whom she belonged, eight in number, were in the same pitiful condition. She had been recommended to the Ladies of the Presentation, by Rev. George Usher, as a fit object for relief, and accordingly she and her two sisters received a daily breakfast at that excellent Institute. They met Mr Usher on the Rahoon road about a fortnight ago, but famine had so preyed upon her feeble constitution, that, on the morning of Wednesday, she was unable to taste food of any description – so that on the post mortem examination made by Doctor Staunton, there was not a particle found in her stomach."

"She with her father, mother, brothers, and sisters, came to Galway about six weeks ago, in the hope of obtaining some charitable relief, and during that period have been begging in the streets, and about the country. The parents of the deceased formerly resided on the estate of Thomas Martin, Esq, MP. When Doctor Staunton was called on he found deceased is a state of inanition, except an occasional convulsive action of the muscles, and her body might be said to be literally skin and bone – with all the appearance of starvation. She was so exhausted, as not to be able to use the food supplied to her. The Jury found that her death was caused for want of the common necessaries of life, before she received relief at the Presentation Convent."

On 4 July 2012 the Galway Famine Ship Memorial was dedicated at the Celia Griffin Memorial Park at Grattan Beach, Galway. According to the Galway Independent, "The unveiling of the monument will be Galway’s tribute to Celia Griffin and the many thousands of children like her who perished in the Famine, and also to the ships and crews which carried so many of our people to safety ... [as] ... Celia Griffin has come to symbolise all the children who lost their lives in the Great Famine."

See also

 Honor Flaherty, Famine victim.

External links
 https://web.archive.org/web/20120717221827/http://galwayindependent.com/stories/item/3041/2012-27/Celia-Griffin

1847 deaths
People from County Galway
19th-century Irish people
1841 births
Deaths by starvation
Irish children
Child deaths